Not of This Earth is a 1995 American film which was part of the Roger Corman Presents series on Showtime. It was a remake of Corman's 1957 film, Not of this Earth (which Corman had already remade in 1988).

Plot
An invader from outer space arrives looking to get blood from the human race.

Cast
Michael York as Paul Johnson
Parker Stevenson as Jack Sherbourne
Mason Adams as Dr Rochelle
Elizabeth Barondes as Amanda Sayles
Richard Belzer as Jeremy Pallin
Bob McFarland as Detective Mark Willows
Ted Davis as Rodman Felder
Wendy Buckner as Cheryl
Joshua D Comen as Danny
Jennifer Coolidge as Nurse
Eddie Driscoll as John
Mary Scheer as Saleswoman

References

External links
Not of this Earth at TCMDB

Not of this Earth at Letterbox DVD

1995 films
Films produced by Roger Corman
American science fiction television films
1990s science fiction films
Films directed by Terence H. Winkless
1990s English-language films
1990s American films